Omarigliptin (MK-3102) is a potent, long-acting oral antidiabetic drug of the DPP-4 inhibitor class used for once-weekly treatment of type 2 diabetes and currently under development by Merck & Co. It inhibits DPP-4 to increase incretin levels (GLP-1 and GIP), which inhibit glucagon release, which in turn increases insulin secretion, decreases gastric emptying and decreases blood glucose levels.

History
Marizev (omarigliptin) 25 mg and 12.5 mg tablets were approved by Japan's Pharmaceuticals and Medical Devices Agency (PMDA) on 28th Sept 2015. Japan was the first country to have approved omarigliptin. However Merck has announced that the company will not submit marketing application in the US and Europe.

References

See also 
 Dipeptidyl peptidase-4 inhibitor
 Alogliptin
 Linagliptin
 Saxagliptin
 Sitagliptin
 Vildagliptin

Dipeptidyl peptidase-4 inhibitors
Fluoroarenes
Sulfonamides
Phenylethanolamine ethers
Merck & Co. brands